The Odense Symphony Orchestra (Odense Symfoniorkester) is a Danish symphony orchestra based in Odense.  The orchestra is resident in the Odense Concert Hall (inaugurated in 1982), specifically in the Carl Nielsen Hall (seating capacity of 1,212).  Since 2007, its chief executive is Finn Schumacker.

History 
The precursor roots of the orchestra date to the early 19th century. The orchestra was established under its current name in 1946.  The orchestra initially began with 23 musicians, as a theatre orchestra.  The current orchestra numbers on the order of 73 permanent musicians and a high level of activity.

The orchestra's most recent chief conductor was Alexander Vedernikov, who served in the post from 2009 to 2018.  Vedernikov now has the title of æresdirigent (honorary conductor) of the orchestra. In October 2019, Pierre Bleuse first guest-conducted the orchestra, and returned for an additional guest-conducting engagement in February 2020, as a substitute for Vedernikov.  In April 2020, the orchestra announced the appointment of Bleuse as its next chief conductor, effective with the 2021–2022 season, with an initial contract of 3 seasons.

Chief conductors
 Poul Ingerslev-Jensen (1946–1948) 
 Arne Hammelboe (1948–1949)
 Martellius Lundqvist (1949–1967)
 Karol Stryja (1968–1984)
 Tamás Vetö (1984–1987)
 Othmar Mága (1987–1991)
 Edward Serov (1991–1995)
 Jan Wagner (1997–2002)
 Paul Mann (2005–2008)
 Alexander Vedernikov (2009–2018)
 Pierre Bleuse (designate, effective 2021)

See also
 List of concert halls in Denmark

References

Danish orchestras
Musical groups established in 1946
1946 establishments in Denmark